Zhou Yang  (born 2 January 1971) is a Chinese footballer who played as a midfielder for the China women's national football team. She was part of the team at the inaugural 1991 FIFA Women's World Cup and 1995 FIFA Women's World Cup.

International goals

References

External links
 

1971 births
Living people
Chinese women's footballers
China women's international footballers
Place of birth missing (living people)
1991 FIFA Women's World Cup players
1995 FIFA Women's World Cup players
Women's association football midfielders
Footballers at the 1990 Asian Games
Footballers at the 1994 Asian Games
Asian Games gold medalists for China
Asian Games medalists in football
Medalists at the 1990 Asian Games
Medalists at the 1994 Asian Games